DXBC-TV (channel 39) is an independent television station in General Santos, Philippines. Owned and operated by Brigada Mass Media Corporation, the station maintains studios and hybrid analog/digital transmitter at the Brigada Complex, NLSA Road, Purok Bayanihan, Brgy. San Isidro, General Santos.

The station's original channel assignment, DXFG-TV (channel 46; licensed to Asian Multimedia and Production Company, Inc.), was transferred to TV channel 34 on December 1, 2015, and later to TV channel 39 on September 23, 2019, with stronger and wider signal coverage as the station's transmitter has been relocated to its present home at the Brigada Complex with a power of 10,000 watts. The station is on-air from 4 a.m. to 10 p.m. daily.

Programming
Larga Brigada
Banat Brigada Balita
Banat Brigada
Brigada Balita Nationwide sa Umaga
Tira Brigada Balita Lokal
Tira Brigada
Brigada Mindanao
Brigadahan 1Tahanan
Di Pwede Yan
Itanong Mo Kay Doc
Sine Brigada
Ronda Brigada
Ronda Brigada Sabado
Ronda Clock
Crosstalk
Agri Tayo Soccsksargen
KaBrigadahan Nationwide
Puntos ni Elmer Catulpos

Defunct programming 
Brigada Connection
Brigada Balita Nationwide sa Tanghali
Brigada Balita Nationwide sa Hapon
 Insights
 Dokumentao
 Happy Lang
 Brigada Top Stories
 Opinyon 
 Brigada Healthline 
 Imbocada Balita
 Brigada Music Video
 Brigada Music Video: Tunog Lokal
 Brigada Music Video: Hitbacks
 Todo-Todo sa Udto
 Giya sa Maayong Panglawas
 Drivemax Pitoytoy
 Harana sa Brigada
 Ang Lungsod Angay nga Masayod 
 Sunday Mass at OLPGV (Our Lady of Peace and Good Voyage)
 Weekend Review
 Brigada Action Line
 PowerCells: Tanong Mo, Sagot ni Doc
 Frontline
 Morning Hataw
 Happy Dreams
 Brigadahan GenSan
 Brigada Mornings
 Just In
 Engkwentro
 Brigada Tanghali Saya (BTS)

Personalities

Present
Elmer Catulpos
Atty. Froebel Kan Balleque (main anchor)
Jennifer Solis (station manager)
Dyll Bartolaba
Joel Eduque
Erine Dejecacion
Hannah Perez
Rona Mujemulta
Leo Martin Cellan
DJ Justine Manansala
Klarisse Morales
CJ Sering
Val Guilaran
Abner Francisco
David Amor
Jocille Cervantes
Sharmiella Calinawan
Jane Alido
Nathalie Sariego
Jay Mark Canlas
Russiel Jean Mantile
Laizelle Labajo
Jose "Dingdong" Ciencia
Kathrina Ilejay-Tan
Cherry Catulpos
Thirdy Santander
Caryl Pizon

Past
Jerry Dumdum
Krizza Feb Udal
Belinda Salas-Canlas (host of Insights and Crosstalk; now with DXMD 927 RMN General Santos)
Kennedy Pingas
Joffrey Bong Cagape (now with 103.1 Radyo Bandera News FM General Santos)
Abner Jun Mendoza Jr.

Austin Papa Calbo Deparoco (now with DXCP 585 Radyo Totoo General Santos)
Eleazardo Don Pakito Mallonga
Gloven Yntong (now with 99.9 Big Radio)
Jeremiah Diana (now with DXMD 927 RMN General Santos)
Jeruz Alcazarin (now with 103.1 Radyo Bandera News FM General Santos)
JB Lee
Leila Dacua
Jessa Leduna
Abby Lorenzo
Jocelyn Jersey Cadeliña (now with 99.9 Big Radio)
Crystal Joy Romano (now with DXCP 585 Radyo Totoo General Santos)
Irish Ampuyas (now with DXCP 585 Radyo Totoo General Santos)
Allan Bambalan (now with DXMD 927 RMN General Santos)
Faith Dandoy (now with 103.1 Radyo Bandera News FM General Santos)
Johanna Quilinderino
Charmaine Betty Uy
Marco Vergara (now with 91.3 Brigada News FM Lebak)
Kent Abrigana (now with GMA Regional TV–One Mindanao)
Abby Caballero (now with GMA Regional TV–One Mindanao)
Sheliene Joy Canda (now Marketing Manager at SM City General Santos)
Atty. Art Cloma
Joe Pula
Rolly Pacquiao (now with 91.1 Pacman Radio)
Adonis Presillas (moved to 96.7 Brigada News FM Butuan)
Reyna Albutra
Eva Caitom
Sean David Ruba
Mark Gerodias
Carlo Dugaduga (moved to 96.7 Brigada News FM Butuan)

Digital television

Digital channels
UHF Channel 37 (611.143 MHz)

Areas of coverage

Primary areas 
 General Santos (urban and rural areas)
 South Cotabato
 Sarangani Province
 North Cotabato

See also
 89.5 Brigada News FM - sister FM station

References

Television stations in General Santos
Television channels and stations established in 2012
2012 establishments in the Philippines
Digital television stations in the Philippines